The BWF World Tour Finals, officially HSBC BWF World Tour Finals, which succeeds BWF Super Series Finals, is an annual badminton tournament which is held every December of a year where the players with the most points from that calendar year's events of the BWF World Tour compete for total prize money of at least US$ 1,500,000.

Features

Prize money 
The tournament offers minimum total prize money of USD$1,500,000. The prize money is distributed via the following formula:

World ranking points 

Below is the point distribution for each phase of the tournament based on the BWF points system for the BWF World Tour Final event.

Eligibility 

At the end of the BWF World Tour circuit, top eight players/pairs in the BWF World Tour standing of each discipline, with the maximum of two players/pairs from the same member association, are required to play in a final tournament known as the BWF World Tour Finals.

If two or more players are tie in ranking, the selection of players will based on the following criteria:

The players who participated in the most BWF World Tour tournaments;
The players who collected the most points in BWF World Tour tournaments starting on 1 July that year.

Results

Performances by nation

See also
 BWF Super Series Finals
 World Badminton Grand Prix Finals

References

External links 
BWF World Tour official website

BWF World Tour